Kettlewell is a surname. Notable people with the surname include:

Bernard Kettlewell (1907–1979), British physician and geneticist
Danielle Kettlewell (born 1992), Australian synchronised swimmer
John Kettlewell (1653–1695), English clergyman
Henry Kettlewell (1876–1963), British cricketer
Professor Kettlewell, a villain in the Doctor Who television serial Robot
Roger Kettlewell (born 1945), Canadian football player
Ruth Kettlewell (1913–2007), British actress
Stuart Kettlewell (b. 1984), Scottish footballer